Tomentypnum is a genus of mosses belonging to the family Brachytheciaceae.

The species of this genus are found in Northern Hemisphere.

Species:
 Tomentypnum falcifolium Tuomikoski, 1967
 Tomentypnum nitens Loeske, 1911

References

Hypnales
Moss genera